The Church of St. Joseph is a historic church building located at 1109 K Street in Los Banos, California. Built in 1923, the church was designed in the Romanesque Revival style, a common style for church buildings. Charles Fantoni, a San Francisco architect, designed the church; it is one of only three surviving Fantoni designs, the other two being Saints Peter and Paul Church in San Francisco and Our Lady of Help Christians Church in Watsonville. The church's design features extensive use of rounded arches, arches and vaults in both the interior and exterior of the building, and a low pitched roof atop the apse. The church is the only Romanesque building in Los Banos and its surrounding communities. The building no longer functions as a church and is used by the Los Banos Arts Council.

The Church of St. Joseph was added to the National Register on July 8, 2004.

References

External links

Roman Catholic churches in California
Buildings and structures in Merced County, California
Los Banos, California
Roman Catholic churches completed in 1923
National Register of Historic Places in Merced County, California
Churches on the National Register of Historic Places in California
Romanesque Revival church buildings in California
20th-century Roman Catholic church buildings in the United States